Plagiosarus binoculus is a species of beetle in the family Cerambycidae. It was described by Henry Walter Bates in 1880.

References

Acanthoderini
Beetles described in 1880